Tropical Storm One was an extremely deadly cyclone which developed in the central Bay of Bengal on May 22, strengthened to a peak of 70 mph winds before hitting Bangladesh on the 25th. The storm brought torrential rains and flooding, killing around 11,069 people and leaving hundreds of thousands homeless.

Meteorological history 

On May 22, a depression formed in the Bay of Bengal, it rapidly intensified to a tropical storm on May 24, it made landfall and dissipated on May 25.

Impact and aftermath 

As tropical storm one made landfall in Bangladesh, it brought winds of 70 mph and a storm surge up to 3 meters high and heavy torrential rains and flooding, killing around 11,069 people. Every single people in the char of Urichar, which back then was approximately 500 people, is thought to be swept into the Bay of Bengal. A pilot who flew over the char said it was swept by waves, like it was inside the fireball on an atomic bomb. A total of 1.3 million people was affected. Approximately 137,000 homes were damaged, 102,000 of them were destroyed, 133,00 acres of crops damaged, and 120,000 cattle were killed.

International assistance
After the cyclone passed, other nations began helping.

UNDRO: Emergency grant $30,000

UNDP: Emergency grant $30,000

Ireland: For emergency relief $15,088.24, for rehabalation $30,176.49, Total $45,263.45

USA: Cash $25,000

Red cross (FED.REP. Germany: cash $96,774

Shipbuilding Foundation Ryokhi Ssawaka (Japan): cash $40,000

See also 

1985 North Indian Ocean cyclone season
1991 Bangladesh cyclone (1991) – A extremely powerful and extremely deadly cyclone that made landfall on Bangladesh on April 29, 1991, with a peak of 160 mph on the coast of Chittagong.
1988 Bangladesh cyclone (1988) – A powerful and extremely deadly cyclone that made landfall on the coast of Khulna Division with a peak of 130 mph.
Cyclone Sidr (2007) – A extremely powerful and extremely deadly cyclone that made landfall near Mongla with a peak of 160 mph.

References 

Tropical cyclones in Bangladesh